Anil Sharma (born 30 June 1956) is an Indian politician, agriculturist and businessman from Himachal Pradesh. He was elected to the Himachal Pradesh Legislative Assembly from Mandi as a member of the Indian National Congress in 1993, 2007, and 2012 and as a member of the Bharatiya Janata Party in 2017. He is also the father of actor Aayush Sharma and son of Pandit Sukh Ram.

Political career 

Sharma was also Minister of State for Youth Services, Sports and Forest in Virbhadra Singh Government from 1993 to 1996. He was elected to the Rajya Sabha in 1998 as member of Himachal Vikas Congress which was formed by his father Sukh Ram after they were expelled from the Congress party after the telecom scam. He was also Minister of Virbhadra Singh Government from 2012 to 2017.

In 2017, prior to elections, Sharma joined Bharatiya Janata Party along with his father Sukh Ram and son Aashray Sharma. It is considered as impact of Sukh Ram that BJP won 9 out of 10 seats in Mandi district.

He was Minister of Multi Purpose Projects, Power, Non Conventional Energy Sources in Jai Ram Thakur cabinet from 2017 to 2019.

In 2019, Sukh Ram crossed over from Bharatiya Janata Party to Indian National Congress along with his grandson Aashray Sharma who was given ticket from Mandi Lok Sabha seat. This led to resignation of Sharma from his minister's post.

Personal life 

He is son of Sukh Ram, former Minister of Communications and Information Technology from 1993 to 1996. His son Aashray Sharma was given ticket from Mandi Lok Sabha seat. His other son Aayush Sharma is married to Salman Khan's sister Arpita.

References

1956 births
Living people
People from Mandi, Himachal Pradesh
Himachal Pradesh MLAs 2017–2022
Himachal Vikas Congress politicians
Indian National Congress politicians from Himachal Pradesh
Bharatiya Janata Party politicians from Himachal Pradesh
Rajya Sabha members from Himachal Pradesh
Himachal Pradesh MLAs 1993–1998
Himachal Pradesh MLAs 2007–2012
Himachal Pradesh MLAs 2012–2017